Fleshkiller is a death metal band from Norway and Indiana, United States.

History
Fleshkiller started in 2015 in Norway as a side project of Ole Børud of the progressive metal band, Extol and Peter Dalbakk of the band Vardøger. Børud and Dalbakk were former bandmates of the band Schaliach, a death-doom band they formed together. The two hired drummer Andreas Skorpe Sjøen from the band Umpfel. The band added Ole Vistnes as the band's bass player, of the bands Shining and Tristania.

Dalbakk would later quit the band due to spending more time with his family. The band would replace Dalbakk with Elisha Mullins, vocalist of The Burial and former guitarist of A Hill to Die Upon. Børud had gotten in contact with Mullins through both of their time on Facedown Records roster. The band would later sign to Indie Recordings in Europe and Facedown Records in North America to release their debut album Awaken.

On June 30, 2017, the band released their debut single, "Parallel Kingdom". The band released their second single "Warfare" on August 18, 2017, via a music video. On September 1, 2017, the band released "Salt of the Earth", their third and final single before the album released on September 15. The album came out on September 15, 2017, which received fantastic reception.

Musical style and influences
Much like Extol, Fleshkiller draws influences from several different bands, including Death, Steely Dan, Yes, and Necrophagist.

The band plays a style of thrash metal and death metal, which was influenced by Death, but with a sense of harmony of progressive rock, which was primarily influenced by Yes. The band remains close lyrically to what Extol had promoted through the Christian metal genre. The band has been compared to Devin Townsend, Textures, and Animals As Leaders.

Members
Current members
Ole Børud - guitars, vocals (2015–present) (Extol, Schaliach, Arnold B. Family, Selfmindead)
Elisha Mullins - guitars, vocals (2017–present) (The Burial, A Hill to Die Upon, War of Ages)
Ole Vistnes - bass (2016–present) (Shining, Tristania, Extol)
Andreas Skorpe Sjøen - drums (2016–present) (Umpfel)

Former members
Peter Dalbakk - vocals (2015–2017) (Schaliach, Vardøger)

Discography
Studio albums
 Awaken (Facedown Records/Indie Recordings; September 15, 2017)

Singles
 "Parallel Kingdom" (June 30, 2017)
 "Warfare" (August 18, 2017)
 "Salt of the Earth" (September 1, 2017)

References

Swedish Christian metal musical groups
Musical groups established in 2015
Facedown Records artists
Swedish progressive metal musical groups
Extreme metal musical groups
Christian extreme metal groups